The following highways are numbered 834:

Ireland
  R834 regional road

United States